Alessandro Argoli (died 1540) was a Roman Catholic prelate who served as Bishop of Terracina, Priverno e Sezze (1534–1540).

Biography
On 13 November 1534, Alessandro Argoli was appointed during the papacy of Pope Paul III as Bishop of Terracina, Priverno e Sezze.
He served as Bishop of Terracina, Priverno e Sezze until his death in 1540.

References

External links and additional sources
 (for Chronology of Bishops) 
 (for Chronology of Bishops) 

16th-century Italian Roman Catholic bishops
Bishops appointed by Pope Paul III
1540 deaths